Lucy Winchester may refer to:
 Lucy Winchester (novel), a 1945 novel by Christmas Carol Kauffman
 Lucy Winchester (secretary), Kentucky socialite and White House Social Secretary